The Gerchberg–Saxton (GS) algorithm is an iterative phase retrieval algorithm for retrieving the phase of a complex-valued wavefront from two intensity measurements acquired in two different planes. Typically, the two planes are the image plane and the far field (diffraction) plane, and the wavefront propagation between these two planes is given by the Fourier transform. The original paper by Gerchberg and Saxton considered image and diffraction pattern of a sample acquired in an electron microscope.

It is often necessary to know only the phase distribution from one of the planes, since the phase distribution on the other plane can be obtained by performing a Fourier transform on the plane whose phase is known. Although often used for two-dimensional signals, the GS algorithm is also valid for one-dimensional signals.

The pseudocode below performs the GS algorithm to obtain a phase distribution for the plane "Source", such that its Fourier transform would have the amplitude distribution of the plane "Target".

Pseudocode algorithm

 Let:
  FT – forward Fourier transform
  IFT – inverse Fourier transform
  i – the imaginary unit, √−1 (square root of −1)
  exp – exponential function (exp(x) = ex)
  Target and Source be the Target and Source Amplitude planes respectively
  A, B, C & D be complex planes with the same dimension as Target and Source
  Amplitude – Amplitude-extracting function:
    e.g. for complex z = x + iy, amplitude(z) = sqrt(x·x + y·y)
        for real x, amplitude(x) = |x|
  Phase – Phase extracting function:
    e.g. Phase(z) = arctan(y / x)
 end Let
 
 algorithm Gerchberg–Saxton(Source, Target, Retrieved_Phase) is
     A := IFT(Target)
     while error criterion is not satisfied
         B := Amplitude(Source) × exp(i × Phase(A))
         C := FT(B)
         D := Amplitude(Target) × exp(i × Phase(C))
         A := IFT(D)
     end while
     Retrieved_Phase = Phase(A)

This is just one of the many ways to implement the GS algorithm.  Aside from optimizations, others may start by performing a forward Fourier transform to the source distribution.

See also
 Phase retrieval
 Fourier optics
 Holography
 Computer-generated holography
 Adaptive-additive algorithm

References

External links
 Dr W. Owen Saxton's pages  , 
 Applications and publications on phase retrieval from the University of Rochester, Institute of Optics
 A Python-Script of the GS by Dominik Doellerer
 MATLAB GS algorithms , 
  

Digital signal processing
Physical optics
Articles with example pseudocode